Felicia Laberer (born 13 May 2001) is a German paracanoeist. She represented Germany at the 2020 Summer Paralympics.

Career
Laberer represented Germany at the 2021 Canoe Sprint European Championships in the women's KL3 event and won a gold medal.

Laberer represented Germany at the 2020 Summer Paralympics in the women's KL3 event and won a bronze medal. For winning a bronze medal at the Paralympics, she was awarded the Silver Laural leaf by the President of the Federal Republic of Germany.

References

External links
 
 

2001 births
Living people
Canoeists from Berlin
German female canoeists
ICF Canoe Sprint World Championships medalists in paracanoe
Paracanoeists at the 2020 Summer Paralympics
Recipients of the Silver Laurel Leaf
Medalists at the 2020 Summer Paralympics
Paralympic medalists in paracanoe
Paralympic bronze medalists for Germany
21st-century German women
Paracanoeists of Germany